Trusty Gina is a Eswatini politician. She was Deputy  Deputy Speaker of the House of Assembly of Swaziland from 2003-2008 and the acting Speaker from March 11 to May 11, 2004 and again from October 26 to November 3, 2006.

References

Year of birth missing (living people)
Living people
Swazi women in politics
Speakers of the House of Assembly of Eswatini
21st-century women politicians
Women legislative speakers